Zhang Yufeng (born 9 February 1977 in Shanghai, China) is a Chinese baseball player who was a member of Team China at the 2008 Summer Olympics.

He is currently the manager of the Shanghai Golden Eagles of the China Baseball League.

Sports career
 1989 Changning Children's Sports School;
 1992/1994 Shanghai Municipal Baseball Team;
 1996 National Team

Major performances
 1998/2006 Asian Games – 4th;
 1997/2001 National Games – 2nd

Notes

References
 Profile 2008 Olympics Team China

1977 births
2006 World Baseball Classic players
2009 World Baseball Classic players
2013 World Baseball Classic players
Baseball players at the 1998 Asian Games
Baseball players at the 2006 Asian Games
Baseball players at the 2008 Summer Olympics
Baseball players at the 2010 Asian Games
Baseball players from Shanghai
Chinese baseball players
Living people
Olympic baseball players of China
Asian Games competitors for China